The Route des Seigneurs du Rouergue (Route of the Lords of Rouergue) is a tourist itinerary established in the Aveyron département of France, grouping together 21 separate sites in the former province of Rouergue. In French, most of the sites are referred to as châteaux, but not all are what would be regarded by English speakers as castles.

The owners of the sites, some privately owned, others owned by public bodies, are signatories of a charter which promises reliable opening times, a warm welcome and a wealth of information for visitors.

The 21 sites are:

{| class="wikitable"
|-
|
 Château de Belcastel
 Château du Bosc
 Château de Bournazel
 Château de Brousse
 Château de Calmont d'Olt
 Château du Colombier
 Château de Coupiac
 Château d'Esplas
 Château de Fayet
 Commanderie Hospitalière de Lugan
 Château de Mélac
|
 Château de Montaigut
 Château de Najac
 Château de Peyrebrune
 Château de Peyrelade
 Château de Saint-Beauzély
 Château de Saint-Izaire
 Château de Sévérac
 Château de Valon
 Château de Vézins
 Tour Hospitalière du Viala-du-Pas-de-Jaux
. 
|-
|}

See also

 List of castles in France

References

Castles in Aveyron
Tourist attractions in Aveyron